Hebburn Town Football Club is a football club based in Hebburn, Tyne and Wear, England.

History
The club was founded in 1912 as a works team for the Reyrolles company. Playing under the company name, they joined Division Two of the Jarrow and District Junior League. After World War I they joined Division One of South Shields Combination League, before switching to the Tyneside Combination in 1923. They joined the Tyneside League in 1927, and were league champions in 1938–39. During World War II they joined the Northern Combination in 1941, and after winning the Durham Challenge Cup in 1942–43, they won the league title in 1943–44. The club then joined the North Eastern League for the 1944–45 season, before returning to the Northern Combination in 1945. The club remained in the Combination until rejoining a relaunched North Eastern League in 1959.

In 1960 Reyrolles joined the Wearside League, and were league champions in 1966–67. In 1986 they were renamed Hebburn Reyrolles, before changing their name to Hebburn in 1988. In 1989 they moved up to Division Two of the Northern League, and after finishing fourth in 1991–92, a season that also saw them win the Durham Challenge Cup for a second time, they were promoted to Division One. Despite finishing eleventh in 1994–95 the club were relegated back to Division Two due to issues with their ground. They were promoted again after finishing third in 1999–00 and then adopted their current name. However, they finished in the bottom two in their first season back in Division One and were relegated again.

A third-place finish in Division Two in 2011–12 saw Hebburn promoted to Division One. However, they were relegated back to Division Two at the end of the 2013–14 season. In 2017–18 the club were Division Two runners-up, resulting in promotion to Division One. In 2019–20 they won the FA Vase, beating Consett 3–2 in a match that was delayed until May 2021 due to the COVID-19 pandemic. After the 2020–21 season was also curtailed, the club were promoted to Division One East of the Northern Premier League. They won the Northern League's JR Cleator Cup in July 2021, defeating West Auckland Town 3–1 in the final.

Honours
FA Vase
Winners 2019–20
Northern League
JR Cleator Cup winners 2021
Wearside League
Champions 1966–67
Northern Combination
Champions 1943–44
Tyneside League
Champions 1938–39
Durham Challenge Cup
Winners 1942–43, 1991–92

Records
Best FA Cup performance: Fourth qualifying round, 2011–12
Best FA Trophy performance: Third qualifying round, 2021–22
Best FA Vase performance: Winners, 2019–20
Record attendance: 1,705 vs Plymouth Parkway, FA Vase quarter-finals, 29 February 2020
Biggest win: 13–0 vs Birtley Town Northern League League Cup, 1 October 2019
Heaviest defeat: 10–3

See also
Hebburn Town F.C. players
Hebburn Town F.C. managers

References

External links
Official website

 
Football clubs in England
Football clubs in Tyne and Wear
Association football clubs established in 1912
1912 establishments in England
North Eastern League
Wearside Football League
Northern Football League
Northern Premier League clubs
Works association football teams in England